Sayce Glacier is a glacier flowing into Flandres Bay immediately north of Pelletan Point, on the west coast of Graham Land. Charted by the Belgian Antarctic Expedition under Gerlache, 1897–99. Named by the United Kingdom Antarctic Place-Names Committee (UK-APC) in 1960 for B.J. Sayce (1839–1895), English photographer who, with W.B. Bolton, invented the collodion emulsion process of dry plate photography, which displaced wet collodion in 1864.

Glaciers of Danco Coast